James Clark Bunten (28 March 1875 – 3 June 1935) was a Scottish sailor who competed for the Royal Clyde Yacht Club at the 1908 Summer Olympics.

He was a crew member of the Scottish boat Hera, which won the gold medal in the 12 metre class. He was born and died in Glasgow.

References

External links 
 
 

1875 births
1935 deaths
Sportspeople from Glasgow
Olympic gold medallists for Great Britain
Olympic medalists in sailing
Olympic sailors of Great Britain
British male sailors (sport)
Sailors at the 1908 Summer Olympics – 12 Metre
Scottish Olympic medallists
Scottish male sailors (sport)
Medalists at the 1908 Summer Olympics